Guvard (also Romanized as Gūvard; also known as  Gūrd) is a village in Jirandeh Rural District, Amarlu District, Rudbar County, Gilan Province, Iran. At the 2006 census, its population was 160, in 35 families.

References 

Populated places in Rudbar County